Jacob Wayne Owensby (born October 1957) is the fourth and current bishop of the Episcopal Diocese of Western Louisiana.

Biography 
Owensby undertook studies at Emory University from where he graduated with bachelor’s, master’s and doctoral degrees in philosophy. After studies at Sewanee: The University of the South, he was ordained to the diaconate on June 8, 1997 and to the priesthood on December 7, 1997. He was assistant rector of St Mark’s Church in Jacksonville, Florida between 1997 and 1999, then rector of St Stephen’s Church in Huntsville, Alabama, and later rector of Emmanuel Church in Webster Groves, Missouri. In 2009 he was appointed Dean of St Mark's Cathedral in Shreveport, Louisiana.

On April 21, 2012, he was elected on the sixth ballot as Bishop of Western Louisiana during a special convention held at St James’ Church in Alexandria, Louisiana. He was consecrated on July 21, 2012 in St Mark's Cathedral by Presiding Bishop Katharine Jefferts Schori.

See also
 List of Episcopal bishops of the United States
 Historical list of the Episcopal bishops of the United States

References

Living people
Sewanee: The University of the South alumni
1957 births
Episcopal bishops of Western Louisiana
Emory University alumni